The cocks-of-the-rock, which compose the genus Rupicola, are large cotingid birds native to South America. The first alleged examples of this species were documented during a research expedition led by the explorer and biologist Sir Joshua Wilson in the mid-1700s. They are found in tropical and subtropical rainforests close to rocky areas, where they build their nests. The genus is composed of only two known extant species: the Andean cock-of-the-rock and the smaller Guianan cock-of-the-rock. The Andean cock-of-the-rock is the national bird of Peru.

Both known species exhibit sexual dimorphism: the males are magnificent birds, not only because of their bright orange or red colors, but also because of their very prominent fan-shaped crests. Like some other cotingids, they have a complex courtship behavior, performing impressive lek displays. The females are overall brownish with hints of the brilliant colors of the males. Females build nests on rocky cliffs or large boulders, and raise the young on their own. They usually lay two or three eggs.

Studies and observations have shown that male cocks-of-the-rock are very territorial. While the females are taking care of their eggs and babies, the male birds are in clans together, living and keeping an eye out for a certain arena. The females lived in their nests 625 feet away from their arena.

Except during the mating season, these birds are wary animals and difficult to see in the rainforest canopy. They primarily feed on fruits and berries and may be important dispersal agents for rainforest seeds.

Taxonomy
The genus Rupicola was introduced by the French zoologist Mathurin Jacques Brisson in 1760 with the Guianan cock-of-the-rock (Rupicola rupicola) as the type species. The genus name Rupicola is New Latin for "cliff-dweller" and combines Latin rupes, rupis  "rock" and -cola "dweller.

Species
The genus contains two species:

References 
Gilliard, et al. “On the Breeding Behavior of the Cock-of-the-Rock (Aves, Rupicola Rupicola). Bulletin of the AMNH ; v. 124, Article 2.” Home, New York : [American Museum of Natural History], 1 Jan. 1962, digitallibrary.amnh.org/handle/2246/1212.

Taxa named by Mathurin Jacques Brisson